The Highland Connection is the second album by Celtic rock band Runrig. It was released in 1979.

Track listing
 "Gamhna Gealla" (White Stirks) - 3:38
 "Màiri" - 2:56
 "What Time" - 2:30
 "Fichead Bliadhna" / "Na Luing air Seòladh" (Twenty Years) - 7:50 
 "Loch Lomond" - 5:02
 "Na h-Uain a's t-Earrach" (The Lambs in the Springtime) - 3:38
 "Foghar nan Eilean '78" (Island Autumn '78) - 3:15
 "The Twenty-Five Pounder" - 2:22
 "Going Home" - 3:49
 "Morning Tide" - 4:41
 "Cearcal a' Chuain" (The Ocean Cycle) - 2:47

External links
 Runrig's official website

1979 albums
Scottish Gaelic music
Runrig albums